Mirzet Krupinac (born 6 November 1973) is a Bosnian retired  professional footballer.

Club career
He played the final years of his career in the Austrian lower and amateur leagues.

International career
Kruprinac made two appearances for the Bosnia and Herzegovina national team at the Sahara Millennium Cup in India, in January 2001.

References

External links

1973 births
Living people
People from Zvornik
Bosniaks of Bosnia and Herzegovina
Association football defenders
Bosnia and Herzegovina footballers
Bosnia and Herzegovina international footballers
FK Drina Zvornik players
FK Sarajevo players
SC Austria Lustenau players
NK Zagorje players
FK Sloboda Tuzla players
SC Schwanenstadt players
Premier League of Bosnia and Herzegovina players
2. Liga (Austria) players
Austrian Landesliga players
Austrian 2. Landesliga players
Bosnia and Herzegovina expatriate footballers
Expatriate footballers in Austria
Bosnia and Herzegovina expatriate sportspeople in Austria
Expatriate footballers in Slovenia
Bosnia and Herzegovina expatriate sportspeople in Slovenia